The 1875 Kentucky gubernatorial election was held on August 2, 1875. Democratic nominee James B. McCreary defeated Republican nominee John Marshall Harlan with 58.31% of the vote.

General election

Candidates
James B. McCreary, Democratic
John Marshall Harlan, Republican

Results

References

1875
Kentucky
1875 Kentucky elections